In the 2005-06 Maine Black Bears women's ice hockey season, the Black Bears had 17 wins, 9 losses and 6 ties. The team's Hockey East record was 9 wins, 8 losses, and 4 ties.

Regular season

Schedule

References

Maine Black Bears women's ice hockey seasons
Maine Black Bears Women's Ice Hockey Season, 2005-06
Black
Black